Stylaster is a genus of hydroids in the family Stylasteridae.

Species
The following species are classed in this genus:

 Stylaster alaskanus Fisher, 1938
 Stylaster amphiheloides Kent, 1871
 Stylaster antillarum Zibrowius & Cairns, 1982
 †Stylaster antiquus Sismondi, 1871 
 Stylaster asper Kent, 1871
 Stylaster atlanticus Broch, 1936
 Stylaster aurantiacus Cairns, 1986
 Stylaster bellus (Dana, 1848)
 Stylaster bilobatus Hickson & England, 1909
 Stylaster bithalamus Broch, 1936
 Stylaster blatteus (Boschma, 1961)
 Stylaster bocki Broch, 1936
 Stylaster boreopacificus Broch, 1932
 Stylaster boschmai (Eguchi, 1965)
 Stylaster brochi (Fisher, 1938)
 Stylaster brunneus Boschma, 1970
 Stylaster californicus (Verrill, 1866)
 Stylaster campylecus (Fisher, 1938)
 Stylaster carinatus Broch, 1936
 †Stylaster chibaensis Eguchi, 1954 
 Stylaster cocosensis Cairns, 1991
 Stylaster complanatus Pourtalès, 1867
 †Stylaster compressus Roemer, 1863 
 Stylaster corallium Cairns, 1986
 Stylaster crassior Broch, 1936
 Stylaster crassiseptum Cairns & Lindner, 2011
 †Stylaster cretaceous Jell, Cook & Jell, 2011 
 Stylaster densicaulis Moseley, 1879
 Stylaster dentatus Broch, 1936
 Stylaster divergens Marenzeller, 1904
 Stylaster duchassaingi Pourtalès, 1867
 Stylaster eguchii (Boschma, 1966)
 Stylaster elassotomus Fisher, 1938
 Stylaster erubescens Pourtalès, 1868
 Stylaster filogranus Pourtalès, 1871
 Stylaster flabelliformis (Lamarck, 1816)
 Stylaster galapagensis Cairns, 1986
 Stylaster gemmascens (Esper, 1794)
 †Stylaster gigas Cairns & Grant-Mackie, 1993 
 Stylaster gracilis Milne Edwards & Haime, 1850
 Stylaster granulosus Milne Edwards & Haime, 1850
 Stylaster griggi Cairns, 2005
 Stylaster griseus Cairns and Zibrowius, 2013
 Stylaster hattorii (Eguchi, 1968)
 Stylaster horologium Cairns, 1991
 Stylaster ibericus Zibrowius & Cairns, 1992
 Stylaster imbricatus Cairns, 1991
 Stylaster incompletus (Tenison Woods, 1883)
 Stylaster incrassatus Broch, 1936
 Stylaster infundibuliferus Cairns, 2005
 Stylaster inornatus Cairns, 1986
 Stylaster kenti Cairns and Zibrowius, 2013
 Stylaster laevigatus Cairns, 1986
 Stylaster leptostylus (Fisher, 1938)
 Stylaster lonchitis Broch, 1947
 Stylaster marenzelleri Cairns, 1986
 Stylaster maroccanus Zibrowius & Cairns, 1992
 Stylaster marshae Cairns, 1988
 Stylaster microstriatus Broch, 1936
 †Stylaster milleri Durham, 1942 
 Stylaster miniatus (Pourtalès, 1868)
 †Stylaster mooraboolensis (Hall, 1893) 
 Stylaster multiplex Hickson & England, 1905
 Stylaster nobilis (Saville Kent, 1871)
 Stylaster norvegicus (Gunnerus, 1768)
 Stylaster papuensis Zibrowius, 1981
 Stylaster parageus (Fisher, 1938)
 Stylaster polymorphus (Broch, 1936)
 †Stylaster priscus Reuss, 1872 
 Stylaster profundiporus Broch, 1936
 Stylaster profundus (Moseley, 1879)
 Stylaster pulcher Quelch, 1884
 Stylaster purpuratus (Naumov, 1960)
 Stylaster ramosus Broch, 1947
 Stylaster repandus Cairns & Lindner, 2011
 Stylaster robustus (Cairns, 1983)
 Stylaster rosaceus (Greeff, 1886)
 Stylaster roseus (Pallas, 1766)
 Stylaster sanguineus  Valenciennes in Milne Edwards & Haime, 1850
 Stylaster scabiosus Broch, 1935
 Stylaster solidus Broch, 1935
 Stylaster spatula Cairns, 1986
 Stylaster stejnegeri (Fisher, 1938)
 Stylaster stellulatus Stewart, 1878
 Stylaster subviolacea (Kent, 1871)
 Stylaster tenisonwoodsi Cairns, 1988
 Stylaster trachystomus (Fisher, 1938)
 Stylaster venustus (Verrill, 1870)
 Stylaster verrillii (Dall, 1884)

References

Hydrozoan genera
Stylasteridae